Lieutenant-General Jamshed Gulzar Kiani (Urdu: جمشید گلزار کیانی; b.20 July 1944 – 1 November 2008), was a three-star rank army general in the Pakistan Army, intelligence officer and the former Colonel Commandant of the Baloch Regiment and commander of X Corps.

An illustrative and long career army and intelligence officer, Kiani came into limelight when he had served as Director-General of the Pakistan Army's Military Intelligence and the commander of the X Corps. Having remembered as an upright and an honest officer during his military career, Kiani had served as a chairman of Federal Public Service Commission during the General Musharraf's regime and had to leave when he and the then Prime Minister Shaukat Aziz developed differences.

Biography

Early life and military service
Jamshed Gulzar Kiani was born on 20 July 1944 in Bombay, British India. He was educated at the Gordon College before accepting at the military academy. He attended and graduated from the Pakistan Military Academy in the class of 38th PMA Long Course, and gained commissioned in the Baloch Regiment as 2nd Lt. in 1964. He participated in the second war with India, leading a platnoon, and later joined the ISI as an intelligence officer.

In 1969–71, Captain Kiani was stationed in Dacca, East Pakistan as an ISI analyst, joining the GHQ Dhaka of the Eastern Command led by its commander, Lieutenant-General A.A.K. Niazi. During this time, Capt. Kiani developed serious problems on the military strategy led by General Niazi, publicly disagreeing with him over the law and order issue, specifically in regards to the intelligence based on the air operations led by the Indian IAF and Indian Navy in East. Capt. Kiani fought against the Indian Army on the eastern border but due to his objections on General Niazi's and his staff, he was recalled to back to Pakistan, avoiding becoming prisoner of war.

In interview given to Dr. Shahid Masood, Kiani had famously called that: "General Niazi was a total and abject failure general who had no control over the situation." Recalling his memories from East, Kiani quoted that "General Niazi totally failed in East Pakistan and his role was very embarrassing which is a matter of regret." While in East, Capt. Kiani was confided with the information from the U.S.Consulate-General in Dhaka that the 7th Fleet had been deployed for Pakistani soldiers' relieve and retreat. However, the 7th Fleet never arrived due to Soviet Union's Pacific Fleet began trailing the American fleet, making it unable to assist in Pakistani defense.

About the surrender of Eastern Command, Kiani said: our soldiers fought diligently and bravely but it was the military leadership that failed in East, not soldiers.

In 1972, he was promoted as Major, continuing his service with the ISI in Karachi, where he worked on the classified assignments covering the security and intelligence management. In 1980s, he went to attend the National Defence University (NDU) and graduated with MSc in War studies before posting back to the Military Intelligence (MI) where Colonel Kiani worked with then-Brigadier Pervez Musharraf on Siachen mission helping him to secure two intermediate posts, Bilafond La in Siachen Glacier.

In 1990s, Brig. Kiani held the command of the 111th Infantry Brigade in Rawalpindi, as his one-star assignment before being promoted as Major-General in 1996–97.

Kargil debacle and X Corps

In 1999, Major-General Kiani was the Director-General of the Military Intelligence when the Kargil fiasco took place with the Indian Army. When India mounted counter-attacks on Pakistani forces incursion in the Kargil sector, Major-General Kiani prepared presentation and briefed then-Prime minister Nawaz Sharif, which according to him, had nothing to do with Kargil conflict, on 12 March 1999. During the event from May to July 1999, Major-General Kiani had given presentation to Joint Chiefs Staff Committee every single week on the conflict, and had given presentation to Prime minister only three times on the conflict.

Major-General Kiani's career remained hidden in the public until coming to the public notice when the news media identified him as the GOC-in-C of the X Corps, when the military takeover took place in October 1999. During the interview with Shahid Masood in Geo News, Kiani clarified his role by stating that he was the major-general during the coup d'état and was promoted to three-star assignment on 1 November 1999.

Lieutenant-General Kiani took over the command of the X Corps from the outgoing Lieutenant-General Mahmud Ahmed, which he led until 2001. Lieutenant-General Kiani attended the meeting Chief of Army Staff General Pervez Musharraf regarding the terrorist attacks in New York, United States where he, along with others, dissented from the war on terror policy. About the decision of supporting the United States, General Kiani maintained in 2008: "The corps commander is a professional soldier and ignoring his advice leads to losses."

In 2001, General Kiani was removed from his field command assignment and was posted in the Army GHQ in Rawalpindi as an Adjutant-General, which he served until his retirement in 2004. During his farewell meeting with President Musharraf, General Kiani reportedly reminded him to commitment to doff his army uniform during a meeting, he said that the nation needed him. About commenting the Chenagai airstrike in Bajaur Agency, American forces was used in South and North Waziristan and 80 students were killed in a Bajaur Madrassa in an American operation.

Chairman Federal Public Service Commission (2004–06)

General Kiani retired from his military service on 14 October 2004, and was announced to be appointed as the Chairman of the Federal Public Service Commission (FPSC), a government institution responsible for the appointment of the bureaucrats in the Federal Government of Pakistan.

Kiani developed serious differences with Prime Minister Shaukat Aziz in 2006 over introducing of an ordinance. He had severe confrontation with Prime Minister Aziz and was of the view that the row between two men had become a personalized affair though he had pleaded President Musharraf not to drag the FPSC into a controversy. Kiani was succeeded by Shahid Aziz.

According to Kiani, if this power was given to Cabinet ministers they would have gotten their own way. On 30 March 2006, Kiani resigned from the FPSC's chairmanship after the government reduced his tenure by two-and-a-half years through a presidential ordinance. On 13 May 2006, Kiani filed a petition of his dismissal in the Lahore High Court which was declined, therefore, Kiani filed a lawsuit against President Musharraf in the Supreme Court of Pakistan.

A Supreme Court bench was constituted under Justice F.M. Khokhar and issued legal notices to President Musharraf, and Prime Minister Aziz's government to appear before the trial. However, before the trial took place, President Musharraf made an unsuccessful move suspend and dismissed Chief Justice Iftikhar Muhammad Chaudhry, and declared a state of emergency in 2007.

Death

Shortly after his interview with Shahid Masood on Geo News, Kiani was admitted to the CMH in Rawalpindi with the complaint of pain in abdomen where military doctors diagnosed an infection in his stomach and suggested an operation. Despite his operation, his condition deteriorated and kept on ICU ward in a state of coma and died on 1 November 2008 at the age of 64.

His funeral was attended a large number of people belonging to various walks of life besides including the Chief of Army Staff General Ashfaq Pervez Kiani, Chairman Joint Chiefs of Staff Committee General Tariq Majeed, Corps Commander Rawalpindi Lieutenant General Tahir Mehmood, former COAS General Mirza Aslam Baig, former DG ISI General (Retd) Hameed Gul, Regional Police Officer (RPO) Nasir Khan Durrani, members of Pakistan Ex‑Servicemen Association, ex‑Generals, political figures, former Azad Jammu and Kashmir President Sardar M. Anwar Khan, President and General Secretary of Lahore High Court Bar Association (LHCBA) Sardar Asmat Ullah Khan and Malik Siddique Awan and other lawyers. He was survived by his wife and three daughters.

Later, after burial ceremony, Auditor General of Pakistan Army (AGP) Lieutenant General Javed Zia laid floral wreaths on the grave of the late General Kiani on behalf of the Chief of Army Staff (COAS) General Ashfaq Pervez Kiani and Corps Commander Rawalpindi Lt General Tahir Mehmood.

Dissent and criticism on Musharraf

On June 4, 2008, Kiani appeared in Meray Mutabiq, a political talk show, on Geo News and was interviewed by Dr. Shahid Masood where he severely criticised President Pervez Musharraf and his role in Kargil and War on Terror. He termed President Mushrraf's policies as "evil actions", quoting that he had committed grave mistakes by involving the country in Kargil, and his personal role in the War on Terror, which he was of viewed as surrendering to the U.S. threat of pushing Pakistan into the Stone Age and the armed action on the far-right Red Mosque. He was also critical of treatment given to the Afghan ambassador Mullah Abdul Salam Zaeef in 2001, and recommended actions against it but his advice fell on deaf ears.

Calls for Kargil War introspection

In 2008, Kiani called for introspection on the Kargil War by constituting a Commission, and reportedly marked that Nawaz Sharif did not know anything about the Kargil episode nor he was fully briefed on the events. He supported holding of a probe into the Kargil fiasco, adding factors behind the scene, about which people do not know, would also come into the limelight.

In an interview, Masood asked what was General Musharraf's plan, General Kiani said he had briefed Nawaz Sharif and told him that it was a very sensitive issue and he could not unveil all the details to him. He was only apprised of the ongoing situation. Nawaz time and again asked about the truth from senior officials including Sartaj Aziz who was the foreign minister. He also tried to persuade the Chief of Army Staff. General Majid spoke in detail on the issue. General Mahmood was the corps commander then.

Kiani said "Our Jawans (soldiers) bravely fought the Kargil War. I think they revived the memories of the 1965 war. Our officers fought more fiercely than in the 1965 War and repulsed enemy attacks time and again. Despite the fact that supplies were disrupted due to extreme cold, the Jawans continued the war". He repeated that arguments will come up when there will be a probe.

He termed Nawaz's travel to the United States a bid to save the prestige of the Pakistan Army. He said in the meeting of 17 May, Nawaz gave a green signal to the operation. He assured conditional support to General Musharraf that the government would back the operation when he successfully moved forward. If unfortunately the same failed, he would not be in a position to support General Musharraf's game plan. When the army was caught in an awkward situation, he again travelled to the United States to save the symbol of the country, the Pakistan Army.

Criticism and legacy
After his revelation, Kiani was widely criticised by the Major General (retired) Rashid Qureshi, the spokesperson of Pervez Musharraf. Rashid Qureshi termed the charges against Musharraf as "foolish and rubbish". Major-General Qureshi had also said that General Kiani had behaved like "an angry and perturbed child" who was talking senselessly about all the favours bestowed on him. Qureshi leveled charges on him on ethicality and maintained that: "He showed sham loyalty and got promotions and lucrative appointments after retirement. On showing poor performance former Prime minister Aziz sacked him. If he was an upright person, he should have rejected appointment after retirement. Indeed, he was trying to benefit some political elements. During service he did not utter a single word against the policies of Musharraf", the Qureshi concluded."

General Kiani is remembered in Pakistan's defence circles as a brave soldier of the Pakistan Army. Having remembered as upright, strict and an honest intelligence officer of the army, he played an active role in the ex-servicemen society's struggle for separation of the offices of the President and the army chief.

Kiani had faced the threats of court-martial in 2007 for raising voice on many matters that have been tabooed in Pakistan for many years. He asked for an inquiry into Kargil operations, which he called a debacle. He also demanded inquiry into the assault on Red Mosque (Lal Masjid) and the girls' seminary (Jamia Hafsa) of Islamabad and claimed that white phosphorus bombs were used in the assault. He also called for the trial of General Pervez Musharraf for repeatedly violating the constitution.

See also
Indo-Pakistani war of 1971
Pakistani prisoners of war in India
Kargil war
Movement to impeach Pervez Musharraf

References

External links 
 Gen Jamshed Gulzar Kiani (r) July 1928 – Nov 1, 2008

1944 births
2008 deaths
Government Gordon College alumni
Pakistan Military Academy alumni
National Defence University, Pakistan alumni
People of East Pakistan
People of Inter-Services Intelligence
Baloch Regiment officers
Pakistani military personnel of the Indo-Pakistani War of 1971
People of the Bangladesh Liberation War
Pakistani generals
Pakistani memoirists
Pakistani conscientious objectors
Recipients of Hilal-i-Imtiaz
Recipients of Sitara-e-Jurat
Recipients of Tamgha-e-Basalat
20th-century memoirists